Israelyan or Israyelyan (in Armenian Իսրայելյան) is an Armenian surname derived from the word Israel. The Western Armenian variant is Israelian (Իսրայէլեան).

It may refer to:

Israelian
Garik Israelian (born 1963), Armenian-Spanish astrophysicist and scientist 
Vardan Israelian (born 1966), Armenian footballer and Ukrainian football functionary and club president

Israelyan
Karen Israelyan (born 1992), Armenian footballer

Israyelian
Rafayel Israyelian or Rafael Israelyan (1908–1973), Armenian architect

See also
Israeli (disambiguation)
Israel Ori (1658–1711), an Armenian prominent figure of the Armenian national liberation movement and a diplomat that sought the liberation of Armenia from Persia and the Ottoman Empire